Sulfanegen is an experimental antidote for cyanide poisoning.  It is being studied as a prodrug for 3-mercaptopyruvic acid (3-MP).  3-MP has been studied as a potential treatment for cyanide poisoning, but the half-life is too short for it to be clinically effective.  Instead, alternative chemicals such as sulfanegen, the hemithioacetal cyclic dimer of 3-MP, are being evaluated that produce 3-MP in vivo to compensate for the short half-life of 3-MP itself.

Sulfanegen has been shown to be effective in animal studies.  It is being studied as the disodium salt, sulfanegen sodium, and the triethanolamine salt, sulfanegen TEA. One advantage various sulfanegen formulations have over existing treatments for acute cyanide poisoning is that they might be administered by intramuscular injection or orally rather than by intravenous infusion.

References

Antidotes
Dithianes
Dicarboxylic acids
Alpha hydroxy acids